Peter Boddington (1 October 1942 – 19 December 2020) was a British boxer. He was the Amateur Boxing Association 1967 heavyweight champion and subsequently a professional boxer.  Boddington was member of his local boxing club, Rootes ABC.  He went to Whitley Abbey Comprehensive School in Whitley, Coventry.

Boxing career

Amateur
Boddington became the British amateur heavyweight boxing champion winning his title in the 80th Amateur Boxing Association Championships at the Wembley Arena, Wembley, London on 5 May 1967.

Boddington won a silver medal in the 20th European Amateur Boxing Championships in Rome (25 May - 2 June 1967) having a weight of 91 kg.

Professional
Boddington turned professional in September 1967, running his record up to 12-0 with 11 KOs by March 1969.  He then started the tail end of his career, losing 4 of his last 10 bouts - a points and TKO loss to Bunny Johnson, a KO by Paul Cassidy, and a TKO by Mike Schutte to close Boddington's career in his only fight outside the UK, which took place in Johannesburg, South Africa on 2 September 1972.

Professional boxing record

|-
|align="center" colspan=8|18 Wins (15 knockouts, 3 decisions), 4 Losses (3 knockouts, 1 decisions) 
|-
| align="center" style="border-style: none none solid solid; background: #e3e3e3"|Result
| align="center" style="border-style: none none solid solid; background: #e3e3e3"|Record
| align="center" style="border-style: none none solid solid; background: #e3e3e3"|Opponent
| align="center" style="border-style: none none solid solid; background: #e3e3e3"|Type
| align="center" style="border-style: none none solid solid; background: #e3e3e3"|Round
| align="center" style="border-style: none none solid solid; background: #e3e3e3"|Date
| align="center" style="border-style: none none solid solid; background: #e3e3e3"|Location
| align="center" style="border-style: none none solid solid; background: #e3e3e3"|Notes
|-align=center
|Loss
|
|align=left| Mike "The Tank" Schutte
|TKO
|1
|02/09/1972
|align=left| Johannesburg, Gauteng, South Africa
|align=left|
|-
|Win
|
|align=left| Brian Jewitt
|PTS
|8
|01/02/1972
|align=left| Bull Ring Sporting Club, Birmingham, West Midlands, United Kingdom
|align=left|
|-
|Loss
|
|align=left| Bunny Johnson
|TKO
|4
|09/11/1971
|align=left| Wolverhampton, United Kingdom
|align=left|
|-
|Win
|
|align=left| Paul Cassidy
|TKO
|5
|22/09/1971
|align=left| Midlands Sporting Club, Solihull, West Midlands, United Kingdom
|align=left|
|-
|Win
|
|align=left| Brian "City" Hall
|KO
|2
|28/04/1971
|align=left| Midlands Sporting Club, Solihull, West Midlands, United Kingdom
|align=left|
|-
|Loss
|
|align=left| Paul Cassidy
|KO
|2
|17/03/1971
|align=left| Midlands Sporting Club, Solihull, West Midlands, United Kingdom
|align=left|
|-
|Win
|
|align=left| Dave Hallinan
|TKO
|6
|10/11/1970
|align=left| Empire Pool, Wembley, London, United Kingdom
|align=left|
|-
|Win
|
|align=left| Dennis Avoth
|PTS
|8
|08/09/1970
|align=left| Empire Pool, Wembley, London, United Kingdom
|align=left|
|-
|Win
|
|align=left| Rudolph Vaughan
|TKO
|5
|01/06/1969
|align=left| Hilton Hotel, Mayfair, London, United Kingdom
|align=left|
|-
|Loss
|
|align=left| Bunny Johnson
|PTS
|8
|25/03/1969
|align=left| Empire Pool, Wembley, London, United Kingdom
|align=left|
|-
|Win
|
|align=left| Charlie "The War" Wilson
|TKO
|4
|24/02/1969
|align=left| Hilton Hotel, Mayfair, London, United Kingdom
|align=left|
|-
|Win
|
|align=left| Terry Feeley
|TKO
|3
|12/11/1968
|align=left| Empire Pool, Wembley, London, United Kingdom
|align=left|
|-
|Win
|
|align=left| George Dulaire
|TKO
|5
|11/10/1968
|align=left| Hilton Hotel, Mayfair, London, United Kingdom
|align=left|
|-
|Win
|
|align=left| Ulric Regis
|TKO
|4
|18/09/1968
|align=left| Empire Pool, Wembley, London, United Kingdom
|align=left|
|-
|Win
|
|align=left| Lloyd Walford
|TKO
|4
|02/07/1968
|align=left| Shoreditch Town Hall, Shoreditch, London, United Kingdom
|align=left|
|-
|Win
|
|align=left| Ernie Field
|TKO
|7
|09/04/1968
|align=left| Empire Pool, Wembley, London, United Kingdom
|align=left|
|-
|Win
|
|align=left| Obe Hepburn
|KO
|4
|26/02/1968
|align=left| Nottingham Ice Stadium, Nottingham, Nottinghamshire, United Kingdom
|align=left|
|-
|Win
|
|align=left| Tommy "Gun" Woods
|TKO
|3
|08/01/1968
|align=left| Nottingham Ice Stadium, Nottingham, Nottinghamshire, United Kingdom
|align=left|
|-
|Win
|
|align=left| Charlie "The War" Wilson
|PTS
|8
|28/11/1967
|align=left| Victoria Baths, Nottingham, Nottinghamshire, United Kingdom
|align=left|
|-
|Win
|
|align=left| Barry Rodney
|TKO
|2
|07/11/1967
|align=left| Empire Pool, Wembley, London, United Kingdom
|align=left|
|-
|Win
|
|align=left| "Boxing" Bert Johnson
|TKO
|2
|10/10/1967
|align=left| Victoria Baths, Nottingham, Nottinghamshire, United Kingdom
|align=left|
|-
|Win
|
|align=left| Jim McIlvaney
|TKO
|2
|06/09/1967
|align=left| De Montford Hall, Leicester, Leicestershire, United Kingdom
|align=left|
|}

External links
Amateur Boxing Association of England

References

1942 births
2020 deaths
Sportspeople from Coventry
English male boxers
England Boxing champions
Heavyweight boxers
Deaths from the COVID-19 pandemic in England